Susanne Kühn  (born 1969 in Leipzig, Germany) is a contemporary German painter.

Susanne Kühn studied painting and graphic art at the Hochschule für Grafik und Buchkunst Leipzig (HGB) in Germany (1990–1995).
Between 1995 -1998 she lived and worked in New York and completed postgraduate studies at the School of Visual Arts and Hunter College (1995–1996).
In 1998 she moved to Boston. In 2001-02 she was awarded a Radcliffe Fellowship from the Radcliffe Institute for Advanced Study, Harvard University.
Since 2002, Susanne Kühn lives and works in Freiburg i. B. and Nürnberg, Germany.

Since 2015 she is a professor for painting at the Academy of Fine Arts, Nuremberg.

Grants and Fellowships 
 2001–2002 Radcliffe Fellowship, Radcliffe Institute for Advanced Study, Harvard University
 1995–1996 Postgraduate Grant, German Academic Exchange Service, School of Visual Arts and Hunter College, New York

Exhibitions (selection) 
 2015 BANK, Galerie Matthias Kleindienst, Leipzig, Germany
 2014 World of Wild Animals, Beck & Eggeling, Duesseldorf, Germany
 2012 15 Disegni, Sala 1, Centro Internazionale d'Arte Contemporanea,  Rom, Italy
 2012 Besuch, Staedtische Galerie Offenburg, Germany
 2011 Garden Eden, Haunch of Venison, London, GB
 2008 Susanne Kühn, Museum of Contemporary Art Denver, USA
 2008 Future Tense: Reshaping the Landscape, Neuberger Museum of Art Purchase, New York, USA (group-show)
 2007 Susanne Kühn, Kunstverein Freiburg, Germany
 2007 New Paintings, Goff+Rosenthal, New York, USA
 2006 Dragon Veins, University of South Florida Contemporary Art Museum, Tampa, Fla., USA (group show)
 2005 International Biennale of Contemporary Art, Prague, (group show)
 2004 EAST International, Norwich Gallery, Norwich, GB, (group show)
 2003 Works on Paper, Bill Maynes Gallery, New York, USA
 2002 Journey, Radcliffe Institute, Harvard University, Cambridge, USA
 2001 Recent Works, Bill Maynes Gallery, New York, USA
 2000 Recent Paintings, Samek Art Gallery, Bucknell University, Lewisburg, USA

Reviews 
 Philip Auslander: Susanne Kühn – Museum of Contemporary Art Denver. In: ArtForum. 12/2008.
 Melissa Kuntz: Susanne Kühn at Goff+Rosenthal. In: Art in America, 2/2006, Vol. 94 edition 2, S. 129.
 Lovelace, Carey. Susanne Kühn at Bill Maynes, Art in America. 11/2002, Vol. 90 edition 11, S. 160.
 Ken Johnson: ART IN REVIEW; Susanne Kuhn. In: The New York Times. 8 December 2000.
 Thad Ziolkowski: Susanne Kühn – Bill Maynes Gallery. In: ArtForum. 12/1999.
 Roberta Smith: ART IN REVIEW; Suzanne Kuhn. In: The New York Times. 1 October 1999.
 David Ebony: David Ebony's Top Ten. In: Artnet.com. 10/1999.

Monographs 
 Ute Eggeling, Michael Beck (Hrsg.): Susanne Kühn. World of Wild Animals. Beck & Eggeling Kunstverlag, 2014, .
 Staedtische Galerie Offenburg (Hrsg.): Susanne Kühn. Werke – Works 2006–2012. 2012, .
 Forum Kunst Rottweil (Hrsg.): Susanne Kühn – Malerei, Zeichnung 2007–2009. Modo Verlag, 2009, .
 Detlef Bluemler, Lothar Romain (Hrsg.): Künstler – Kritisches Lexikon der Gegenwartskunst. Ausgabe 81, Zeitverlag, 2008, .
 Kunstverein Freiburg and Museum of Contemporary Art, Denver (Hrsg.): Susanne Kühn. Hatje Cantz, 2007, .

References

1969 births
Living people
20th-century German painters
21st-century German painters
21st-century German women artists
20th-century German women artists
Artists from Leipzig
Hochschule für Grafik und Buchkunst Leipzig alumni